Stephen Thomas Melledew (born 28 November 1945) is an English retired professional football forward and midfielder who played in the Football League, most notably for Rochdale and Aldershot. After his retirement as a player, he became a manager and coach in non-league football.

Personal life 
Melledew's son Thomas also became a footballer and played under his father's management in non-league football.

Honours 
Rochdale

 Football League Fourth Division third-place promotion: 1968–69

Aldershot

 Football League Fourth Division fourth-place promotion: 1972–73

Bury

 Football League Fourth Division fourth-place promotion: 1973–74

Individual

 Aldershot Player of the Year: 1972–73

Career statistics

References 

1945 births
Living people
Footballers from Rochdale
Association football forwards
English footballers
Association football midfielders
Rochdale A.F.C. players
Everton F.C. players
Aldershot F.C. players
Bury F.C. players
Crewe Alexandra F.C. players
Boston Minutemen players
English Football League players
Hillingdon Borough F.C. players
North American Soccer League (1968–1984) players
English expatriate footballers
Expatriate soccer players in the United States
English expatriate sportspeople in the United States
Thatcham Town F.C. managers
Newbury F.C. managers
Southern Football League players
English football managers